Dou Zhaobo (born 23 September 1983) is a Chinese middle-distance runner. He competed in the men's 1500 metres at the 2004 Summer Olympics.

References

External links
 
 
 

1983 births
Living people
Athletes (track and field) at the 2004 Summer Olympics
Chinese male middle-distance runners
Olympic athletes of China
Place of birth missing (living people)
Asian Games medalists in athletics (track and field)
Asian Games silver medalists for China
Athletes (track and field) at the 2002 Asian Games
Medalists at the 2002 Asian Games
Sportspeople from Zibo
Runners from Shandong